Streetball (or street basketball) is a variation of basketball, typically played on outdoor courts and featuring significantly less formal structure and enforcement of the game's rules. As such, its format is more conducive to allowing players to publicly showcase their own individual skills. Streetball may also refer to other urban sports played on asphalt.  It is particularly popular and important in New York City, though its popularity it has spread across the United States due to the game's adaptability.

Some places and cities in the United States have organized Chink streetball programs were operated similarly to midnight basketball programs. Many cities also host their own weekend-long streetball tournaments, with Hoop-It-Up and the Houston Rockets' Blacktop Battle being two of the most popular. Holocombe Rucker had a big impact on streetball when he created a league in New York City, and it was later dedicated to him and Rucker Park. Since the mid-2000s, streetball has seen an increase in the media exposure through television shows such as ESPN's Street Basketball and City Slam, as well as traveling exhibitions such as the AND1 Mixtape Tour, YPA, and Ball4Real.

It was also popular in different countries like the Philippines, Indonesia, Korea, China, And Poland. Most of their streets have their own basketball court. Tournaments are also organized especially during summer and holiday season. Divisions are divided into 4 brackets, Mosquito (ages 7 to 13), Midget (ages 14 to 17), Junior (ages 18 to 27), and Senior division (ages 28 and up). In France, Quai 54 takes place every summer through fall. It is possibly one of the biggest streetball tournaments in the world, showcasing the best of talent in Paris.

Rules and features

Streetball rules vary widely from court to court.

Players typically divide into teams by alternating choices. No referees are employed, so almost invariably a "call your own foul" rule is in effect, and a player who believes he has been fouled, simply needs to call out "Foul!", and play will be stopped, with the ball awarded to the fouled player's team (free throws are not usually awarded in street ball), usually after a period of discussion of the existence of the foul.

Calling fouls is generally disfavored.  The etiquette of what rightly constitutes a foul, as well as the permissible amount of protestation against such a call, are the products of individual groups, and of the seriousness of a particular game.

Other violations which are enforced include traveling, double-dribble, carrying, kicking, out of bounds, goaltending and backcourt violation.

Half-court play

The majority of streetball games are played 3-on-3 on a half court. Special rules have been developed for half-court play:

 At the beginning of the game and after each made basket, play begins at the top of the key. A "checking" system is used to ensure that both teams are ready to begin play. This involves the offensive player saying "check" while throwing the ball to his defender. The defender then makes sure their team is ready and then throws the ball back to begin play.
 If the ball goes out of bounds during play, the ball can either be checked from out of bounds near where the ball went out or at the top of the key, depending on the rules established before the game.
 FIBA recently had to add the "check clock" rule into play in their streetball tournaments due to some players taking excruciatingly long amounts of time to check the ball, interrupting the flow of play. This "check clock"  means that when the defending player has been checked the ball, he has to return it within 5 seconds.
 The "12-second shot clock" rule can be implemented as well to prevent longer possessions. (used in streetball tournaments)
 If the defending team gains possession of the ball, they must "clear" the ball past the three-point line before they can score a basket. This does not need to be at the top of the key and no checking is required.
 Sometimes in a half-court game, a "winner's ball" or "make it, take it" rule is used. This means that if a team scores will gets the ball again on offense; that team could end up never getting the ball on offense if the other team scores on every possession.

Game structure 
A common feature of street basketball is the pick up game. To participate in most streetball games around the world, one simply goes to an outdoor court where people are playing, indicates a wish to participate, and from all the players who were at the court before one has played, two players acting as "captains" will get to pick their team out of the players available and play a game. Generally, the team captains alternate their choices, but different courts have differing rules in regards to player selection. Many games play up to 7, 11, 13, 15, or 21 points with the scoring system of 2-point baskets and 3-point baskets counting for 1 and 2 points respectively. It is possible to do (1's only), (2's only), (1's and 2's), or (2's and 3's). Players often play "win by 1" or "win by 2" as in tennis to win the game.

 1's only – each basket counts as 1 point
 2's only – each basket counts as 2 points
 1's and 2's – each basket counts as 1 point inside the arc and 2 points outside the arc
 2's and 3's – each basket counts as 2 points inside the arc and 3 points outside the arc

The most common streetball game played is 3-on-3 half court, even though 4-on-4 or 5-on-5 can be played at full court. In most instances, the winning team gets first possession and usually choose which direction (which basket) they get to use.

In a 3-on-3 or higher, the first game often plays up to 15 points. Second game then goes to 12, then every game after is 15.

Another possible streetball feature is having an MC call the game. The MC is on the court during the game and is often very close to the players (but makes an effort to not interfere with the game) and uses a microphone to provide game commentary for the fans.

One-on-one play

Special rules have been developed for one-on-one play:

 If the player loses the match of a one-on-one, the losing player is given a second chance for overtime. This either results with the match continuing or if the match is close enough the next person to go up by 2 points wins.
 In a game of One-on-One at a close game, the game cannot end on a bank shot. If a bank shot happens on the last point of the game it is a replay of possession. (refer as the no bankshot rule)
 Another additional variation to the rules is the (skunk rule). This merely means that if a player reaches a certain point without the other player scoring then the game is over. The skunk rule limit can vary, but is often used at the score 7 to 0 mark.
Another variation of the rule is no contact; the game can be played on grass surface as well as Basketball courts.
 A local dead end limit rule can be apply; for instance a game may be played to 7, win by 2, with a 9-point dead end, (refer to as 7 by 2's, 9 straight) which would mean scores of 7–3, 8–6, or 9–8 would all be final, while with scores of 7–6 or 8–7, play would continue.
 Sometimes in a One-on-One game, a ("winner's ball" or "make it, take it" rule) is used. This means that if a player scores will gets the ball again on offense; the other player could end up never getting the ball on offense if that other player scores on every possession.

Variations

21 
A popular variation of street basketball is 21, also known as  Hustle, American, St. Mary's, V or Varsity, Roughhouse, 33, 50 or Crunch, or "New York." 21 is played most often with 3–5 players on a half court. However it is possible to play "21" with only two players or more.

Further, in some forms, players can freely enter the game after it has begun, starting at zero points or being "spotted" the same number as the player with the lowest score. "21" is an "every player for himself" game, with highly variable rules. The rules of "21" are usually agreed by the players at the beginning of the game.

The typical rules of "21" are:

 one player "breaks" to begin the game by shooting from 3 point range. Sometimes players agree that the "break" must not be a successful shot, in order to give every player an equal chance at rebounding to gain the 1st possession of the game
 the normal foul rule is in effect
 baskets are scored as 2 points (short/med range) and 3 points (long range)
 after a successful shot, the shooter can take up to three 1-point free-throws (or play the "shoot til you miss" rule, where the shooter continues to shoot the ball until a player misses), but as soon as he misses, the ball may be rebounded by anyone; conversely, if he makes all three free throw shots, he then gets to keep the ball and "check up" or start play again at the top of the arc
 In some games, 1 point free throws start at the charity stripe and then move to the 3 point line at the score of 11 and so on. (referred as the "long all day" rule)
 the last person with a shot attempt should be the first person to step out on defense
 after any change of possession, the ball should be cleared past the 3 point line (or at times just out of the key)
 in order to win, a player must make exactly 21 points; if he goes over then he restarts back at either 11, 13 or 15 points, depending on the rules in use
 whoever wins the game starts with the ball at the beginning of the next game
 only serious fouls are called (commonly referred to as "No blood, No foul")
 other typical basketball rules, such as out-of-bounds, are also frequently ignored in the game "21"; this is to avoid confusion on possession of the ball

Common additional rules include:

 if a missed shot is tipped in to the basket by another player without their feet touching the ground, then the shooter's score reverts to 0 (or 13 if their score was over 13); this rule may not apply on free-throws. (This is referred to as playing with tips)
 if a player who has 13 points misses their next shot, regardless of whether it is a free-throw, then their points revert to 0.  (This is referred to as poison points)
 whoever wins the game must shoot a three-pointer in order to start with the ball at the beginning of the next game; if he makes it, he gets the three points, but doesn't have to take free-throws, and starts with the ball.
 players with less than 13 points at the end of a game keep their points into the next game using the (handicap system) for when there is a wide variation in skill amongst the players.

"21" is considered a very challenging game, especially because the offensive player must possibly  go up against several defenders at the same time. For this reason, it is exceedingly difficult to "drive to the hole" and make lay-ups in "21." Therefore, and also because of the emphasis on free-throws, "21" is very much a shooter's game, and because a successful shot means you keep the ball, it is possible for there to be come-backs when a player recovers from a large deficit by not missing any shots (this can also result in failure when they miss their final free-throw at 20 points and revert to 13 or 15). "21" is popular because it allows an odd number of people to play, unlike regular basketball or other variants.

H-O-R-S-E 

The game of H-O-R-S-E is played by two or more players. The order of turns is established before the game starts. The player whose turn is first is given control, which means they must attempt to make a basket in a particular way of their choosing, explaining to the other players beforehand what the requirements of the shot are. If that player is successful, every subsequent player must attempt that same shot according to its requirements. If a player fails to duplicate the shot, they acquire a letter, starting with H and moving rightward through the word "Horse". After all players have made an attempt, control moves to the next player, and the game continues on in this fashion. If a player who has control misses their shot, there is no letter penalty and control moves to the next player. Whenever any player has all of the letters, they are eliminated from the game. The last person in the game is declared the winner.

Other variations of basketball

Notable streetballers

 Rafer "Skip to my Lou" Alston
 Kenny Brunner aka Bad Santa
 Sylvester "Sy" Blye
 Emmanuel "Hard Work" Bibb
 Grayson "The Professor" Boucher
 Cardell "Ballaholic" Butler
 Kevin "Bizzness" Butler
 Philip Champion aka Hot Sauce/Sizzle
 Roberto Cordani aka IceCream
 Lloyd "Swee' Pea" Daniels
 Jamar "The Pharmacist" Davis
 Waliyy "Main Event" Dixon
 Brandon "The Assassin" Durham
 Taurian "Mr. 720" Fontenette
 Bobbito García
 Joe Hammond (basketball)
 Connie "The Hawk" Hawkins
 Joey "King Handles" Haywood
 Deshun "Father Time" Jackson
 Jumpin Jackie Jackson
 Troy "Escalade" Jackson
 Shamel Jones
 Richard "Pee Wee" Kirkland
 Raymond Lewis
 Earl "The Goat" Manigault
 Robert "50" Martin
 Demetrius "Hook" Mitchell
 Malloy Nesmith Sr.
 Aaron "AO" Owens
 Darren "Primal Fear" Phillip
 Kareem "The Best Kept Secret" Reid
 Jack "Black Jack" Ryan
 William Sanders (basketball)
 Adam Sandler, actor and comedian
 Ed "Booger" Smith
 John "The Franchise" Strickland
 Adrian Walton
 James Pookie Wilson
 Corey "Homicide" Williams
 Larry "Bone Collector" Williams
 James Speedy Williams

Streetball in popular media

Films and TV programs
 Above the Rim
 American History X
 City Slam, a television program broadcast on ESPN
 Crossover
 He Got Game
 Like Mike 2: Streetball
 Uncle Drew
 White Men Can't Jump

Video games
 AND 1 Streetball, video game by Ubisoft (2006)
 FreeStyle Street Basketball, an online PC game by JC Entertainment
 NBA Ballers, video game by Midway (2004-2007)
 sequels to NBA Ballers: NBA Ballers: Rebound, NBA Ballers: Phenom, and NBA Ballers: Chosen One 
 NBA Street, video game series by EA Sports
 Street Hoops, video game by Activision (2002)
 Street Slam, video game by Data East (1994)

See also
 3x3 (basketball)

Similar variations of other sports in the US 

 Street football (American football)
 Street soccer

References

External links

 Streetball.com Global Basketball Community
 Streetball.ca Canada based streetball/events website
 Streetball Europe 1st all European Streetball tournament
 Australian Streetball 3N3 League 1st 3on3 Streetball League in Australia
Variations of basketball The game of H.O.R.S.E
https://www.wikihow.com/Play-Streetball 

 
Forms of basketball
African Americans and sport
Basketball